Sugar Creek Covered Bridge is a covered bridge which crosses Sugar Creek southeast of Chatham, Illinois. The bridge was constructed by Thomas Black; sources disagree on the date of construction, placing it at either 1827 or 1880. The State of Illinois acquired the bridge in 1963 and extensively renovated it two years later. The bridge closed to traffic in 1984 and is now part of a local park with a picnic area. It is one of only five historic covered bridges in Illinois and is the oldest of the remaining bridges.

The bridge was added to the National Register of Historic Places on January 9, 1978.

See also
List of covered bridges in Illinois

References

Covered bridges on the National Register of Historic Places in Illinois
Buildings and structures in Sangamon County, Illinois
National Register of Historic Places in Sangamon County, Illinois
Road bridges on the National Register of Historic Places in Illinois
Wooden bridges in Illinois
Burr Truss bridges in the United States